The New South Wales Rugby League is administering several competitions during the 2023 rugby league season in Australia.

Knock-On Effect New South Wales Cup 

The 2023 season of the Knock-On Effect New South Wales Cup will commence on the weekend of 4-5 March, 2023.

There are 13 teams competing in the 2023 NSW Cup.

Draw and Ladder 
The New South Rugby League website maintains a competition ladder and Fixures List (draw) for the New South Wales Cup.  The website, League Unlimited, also maintain a draw and ladder for the NSW Cup.

Finals series 
A Final Series is scheduled for September 2023, following the conclusion of the 26th and last round on Sunday, 27 August 2023.

President's Cup 

The winners of the four conferences are scheduled to meet in a two-week knock-out tournament in September 2023.

Harvey Norman NSW Women's Premiership 
The 2023 season of the Harvey Norman NSWRL Women's Premiership is scheduled to commence on the weekend of 4-5 February 2023.

There are 11 teams competing in the 2023 Harvey Norman NSW Women's Premiership.
  Canterbury-Bankstown Bulldogs
  Central Coast Roosters
  Cronulla Sutherland Sharks
  Illawarra Steelers
  Mounties
  Newcastle Knights
  North Sydney Bears
  South Sydney Rabbitohs
  St George Dragons
  Wentworthville Magpies
  Wests Tigers

Draw and Ladder 
The New South Wales Rugby League website hosts the official Harvey Norman NSW Women's Premiership draw.
The website, League Unlimited, also maintains a draw and ladder. 

Final Series 
A Final Series is scheduled for late April 2023, following the conclusion of the 11th and last round on Monday, 17 April 2023.

Jersey Flegg 
The 2023 season of the Jersey Flegg Cup for Under 21 males is scheduled to commence on the weekend of 4-5 March, 2023.

There are 12 teams competing in the 2023 Jersey Flegg Cup.
  Canberra Raiders
  Canterbury Bankstown Bulldogs
  Cronulla-Sutherland Sharks
  Manly Warringah Sea Eagles
  Melbourne Storm
  Newcastle Knights
  Parramatta Eels
  Penrith Panthers
  South Sydney Rabbitohs
  St. George Illawarra Dragons
  Sydney Roosters
  Wests Tigers

Draw and Ladder 
The New South Wales Rugby League website hosts the official Jersey Flegg Cup draw.
The website, League Unlimited, also maintains a draw and ladder. 

Finals series 
A Final Series is scheduled for September 2023, following the conclusion of the 26th and last round on Sunday, 27 August 2023.

Sydney Shield 
The 2023 season of the Sydney Shield is scheduled to commence on the weekend of 18-19 March 2023.

There are 9 teams competing in the 2023 Sydney Shield.
  Cabramatta Two Blues
  Glebe Dirty Reds
  Hills District Bulls
  Moorebank Rams 
  Mounties 
  Penrith Brothers 
  Ryde-Eastwood Hawks 
  St Marys Saints 
  Wentworthville Magpies 

Draw and Ladder 
The website, League Unlimited, maintains a Sydney Shield draw and ladder. 
The website, Play Rugby League hosts the Sydney Shield draw.

Finals series 
A Final Series is scheduled for August 2023, following the conclusion of the 18th and last round on Sunday, 29 July 2023.

NSW Men's Country Championships 
The 2023 Men's Country Championship is scheduled to commence on the weekend of 4-5 February 2023.

There are 10 teams competing in the 2023 Men's Country Championship .
  Central Coast Roosters
  Illawarra South Coast
  Macarthur Wests Tigers
  Monaro Colts
  Newcastle Maitland Region Knights
  North Coast Bulldogs
  Northern Rivers Titans
  Northern Tigers
  Riverina Bulls
  Western Rams

SG Ball Cup 
The 2023 season S. G. Ball Cup for Under 19 males is scheduled to commence on the weekend of 4-5 February 2023.

There are 16 teams competing in the 2023 SG Ball Cup.
  Balmain Tigers
  Canberra Raiders
  Canterbury Bulldogs
  Cronulla-Sutherland Sharks
  Illawarra Steelers
  Manly Warringhah Sea Eagles
  Melbourne Storm
  Newcastle Knights
  New Zealand Warriors
  North Sydney Bears
  Parramatta Eels
  Penrith Panthers
  South Sydney Rabbitohs
  St George Dragons
  Sydney Roosters
  Western Suburbs Magpies

Draw and Ladder 
The New South Wales Rugby League website hosts the official SG Ball Cup draw.

Finals series 
A Final Series is scheduled for April 2023, following the conclusion of the 9th and last round on Sunday, 2 April 2023.

Harold Matthews Cup 
The 2023 season Harold Matthews Cup for Under 17 males is scheduled to commence on the weekend of 4-5 February 2023.

There are 15 teams competing in the 2023 SG Ball Cup.
  Balmain Tigers
  Canberra Raiders
  Canterbury Bulldogs
  Central Coast Roosters
  Cronulla-Sutherland Sharks
  Illawarra Steelers
  Manly Warringah Sea Eagles
  Newcastle Knights
  North Sydney Bears
  Parramatta Eels
  Penrith Panthers
  South Sydney Rabbitohs
  St George Dragons
  Sydney Roosters
  Western Suburbs Magpies

Draw and Ladder 
The New South Wales Rugby League website hosts the official Harold Matthews Cup draw.

Finals series 
A Final Series is scheduled for April 2023, following the conclusion of the 9th and last round on Sunday, 2 April 2023.

Tarsha Gale Cup 
The 2023 season Tarsha Gale Cup for Under 19 females is scheduled to commence on the weekend of 4-5 February 2023.

There are 13 teams competing in the 2023 Harvey Norman Tarsha Gale Cup.
  Canberra Raiders
  Canterbury Bulldogs
  Cronulla-Sutherland Sharks
  Illawarra Steelers
  Indigenous Academy Sydney Roosters
  Manly Warringah Sea Eagles
  Newcastle Knights
  North Sydney Bears
  Parramatta Eels
  Penrith Panthers
  South Sydney Rabbitohs
  St George Dragons
  Wests Tigers

Draw and Ladder 
The New South Wales Rugby League website hosts the official Tarsha Gale Cup draw.

Finals series 
A Final Series is scheduled for April 2023, following the conclusion of the 9th and last round on Sunday, 2 April 2023.

Laurie Daley Cup 
The 2023 season Laurie Daley Cup for Under 18 males is scheduled to commence on the weekend of 4-5 February 2023.

There are 10 teams competing in the 2023 Laurie Daley Cup.
  Central Coast Roosters
  Illawarra South Coast
  Macarthur Wests Tigers
  Monaro Colts
  Newcastle Maitland Region Knights
  North Coast Bulldogs
  Northern Rivers Titans
  Northern Tigers
  Riverina Bulls
  Western Rams

Draw and Ladder 
The New South Wales Rugby League website hosts the official Laurie Daley Cup draw.

Finals series 
A Final Series is scheduled for March 2023, following the conclusion of the 5th and last round on Sunday, 5 March 2023.

Andrew Johns Cup 
The 2023 season Andrew Johns Cup for Under 18 males is scheduled to commence on the weekend of 4-5 February 2023.

There are 10 teams competing in the 2023 Andrew Johns Cup.
  Central Coast Roosters
  Illawarra South Coast
  Macarthur Wests Tigers
  Monaro Colts
  Newcastle Maitland Region Knights
  North Coast Bulldogs
  Northern Rivers Titans
  Northern Tigers
  Riverina Bulls
  Western Rams

Draw and Ladder 
The New South Wales Rugby League website hosts the official Andrew Johns Cup draw.

Finals series 
A Final Series is scheduled for March 2023, following the conclusion of the 5th and last round on Sunday, 5 March 2023.

References

2023 in Australian rugby league
Rugby league in New South Wales
Rugby league competitions in New South Wales